The Bradford Premier League (currently known as the Gordon Rigg Bradford Premier League for sponsorship reasons) is an amateur cricket competition centred in Bradford, West Yorkshire. It has been described as "arguably England's strongest amateur competition." This is despite most people being aware that top clubs have player wage bills in the 5 figure brackets.

The league is structured into four divisions. Many teams are from Bradford, with others from neighbouring towns and cities across West Yorkshire.

The league was renamed the Bradford Premier League in 2016, upon the merger of the Bradford Cricket League and the Central Yorkshire Cricket League, and since 2016 it has been a designated ECB Premier League.  Since 2016, the winners qualify to take part in the Yorkshire Championship, together with the winners of the Yorkshire Premier League North and the Yorkshire South Premier League, and the leading Yorkshire club in the North Yorkshire and South Durham Cricket League.  Hanging Heaton won the Yorkshire Championship in 2017, the only team from the Bradford League to do so thus far.

History
The Bradford Cricket League was formed in 1903 with twelve clubs but only two (Undercliffe and Bankfoot) of the inaugural twelve are current members.

The first club to win the Bradford Cricket League was Shelf, in 1903, claiming their only League title. In total, the League has had twenty-six different winners of its top division. The most successful clubs are Bradford CC and Pudsey St Lawrence CC, with 10 titles each.

The turn of the century saw the domination of Pudsey Congs and Woodlands within the top division. Pudsey Congs won five consecutive titles between 2000 and 2004, and Woodlands won the following four titles.

In 2016, The Bradford Cricket League merged with the Central Yorkshire League to form the Bradford Premier League. Until then, the League had operated as two divisions, but this format was expanded to four divisions to accommodate the extra teams.

The League runs two cup competitions for the first and second teams of every club within the League. The first team competition is the Priestley Cup, which has been running since 1904, and the second team competition is the Priestley Shield, which has been running since 1913. Both the Cup and Shield are named for Sir William Priestley, who donated the presentation trophies for which the competitions are played.

The only club ever to have won the Cup three times in a row is East Bierley, who won in 1998, 1999 and 2000. However, the most successful club in the competition is Undercliffe, who have won it fourteen times.

Structure
The League competition is made up of fixtures of fifty overs per side, with each team playing the others in their division both home and away. The strength of the League and its players is in part assisted by the League management having an open policy on the payment of players and no particular limit on the number of professional players in each game. However, teams are limited to one overseas player. In 2008 some first division sides have fielded as many as six players with professional (first-class) credentials.

There are certain playing restrictions that apply to all League fixtures. Bowlers are limited to bowling a maximum of fifteen overs per innings, the fielding side's innings must be bowled within 3 hours 10 minutes (failure to do so results in a points penalty), and the fielding side must have four fieldsmen plus the wicketkeeper and bowler within a 30-yard fielding circle at the moment of delivery (failure to do so results in a no-ball being called).

Points are awarded as follows: 10 points for a win, 5 points to each side for a tie (scores level), 0 points for a loss, 5 points to each side for abandonment (no play), and 5 points to each side for an abandonment (with play, no win achieved). For all results, bar an abandonment with no play, teams can gain an added maximum of five bonus batting points and five bonus bowling points. Batting points are awarded as 1 point for scoring 125 runs, with an extra 1 point for every further 25 runs (to a maximum of 5 points), and bowling points are awarded as 1 point for every 2 wickets taken. As thus, the maximum number of points that can be gained from a game is 20.

Spectators at first XI matches are often required to pay for entry and a programme. The League management has, from 2008, capped the maximum charge at £3, with concessions at £1.50. Second XI matches are capped at a maximum of 25p for adults and 10p for children. All gate receipts are kept by the home club.

Many of the grounds in the League are quite small. This fact, combined with traditionally good groundskeeping and wickets prepared primarily for batting makes for an exciting blend of cricket popular with supporters.

Winners

 

 

 

 

 

Source:

Performance by season from 2016

2022 1st XI Teams

Premier Division 
 Bankfoot 
  Batley
 Bradford & Bingley
 Cleckheaton 
 Farsley
 Hanging Heaton
 Methley
 New Farnley 
 Ossett 
 Pudsey St. Lawrence
 Townville
 Woodlands

Championship 
 Baildon 
 Birstall 
 Carlton
 East Ardsley 
 East Bierley 
 Gomersal 
 Jer Lane
 Keighley 
 Morley 
 Pudsey Congs
 Undercliffe
 Wrenthorpe

Division One 
 Bowling Old Lane
 Buttershaw St. Pauls
 Crossflats 
 Great Preston
 Hartshead Moor
 Hopton Mills
 Hunslet Nelson
 Lightcliffe
 Northowram Fields 
 Sandal
 Wakefield St. Michaels 
 Yeadon

Division Two 
 Adwalton
 Altofts 
 Brighouse
 Crossbank Methodists
 East Leeds
 Gildersome & Farnley Hill
 Heckmondwike & Carlinghow
 Liversedge 
 Rodley
 Scholes (Cleckheaton) 
 Spen Victoria 
 Windhill & Daisy Hill

Noted players
Some of the more notable members include Leonard Hutton, who was a youngster at Pudsey St Lawrence and Jack Hobbs who played at Idle between 1915 and 1918.  Notable overseas players include West Indian fast bowler Learie Constantine, Indian Test player VVS Laxman and Pakistan batsman Mohammad Yousuf.

The following Bradford League players have played international cricket:

Baildon

 Brian Close (England)
 Matthew Hoggard (England)
 Colin de Grandhomme (New Zealand)

Bankfoot

 Anthony McGrath (England)
 Derek Underwood (England)

Bowling Old Lane

 Mohammad Yousuf (Pakistan)
 Martyn Moxon (England)
 Darren Gough (England)
 Bill Athey (England)
 Doug Padgett (England)
 Frank Lowson (England)
 Harold Rhodes (England)

Bradford & Bingley

 Gareth Batty (England)
 Matthew Hoggard (England)
 Adil Rashid (England)

Brighouse

 George Hirst (England)
 Wilfred Rhodes (England)

Cleckheaton

 Yajurvindra Singh (India)
 Suru Nayak (India)
 Abey Kuruvilla (India)
 Ian Austin (England)
 Andrew Gale (England U19)
 Iain Wardlaw (Scotland)

East Bierley

 Edwin St Hill (West Indies)
 Collis King (West Indies)
 Les Taylor (England)
 Roy Gilchrist (West Indies)
 Nick Cook (England)
 Jack Birkenshaw (England)
 Gavin Hamilton (England/Scotland)

Esholt

 Lou Vincent (New Zealand)

Farsley

 Ray Illingworth (England)
 Brian Bolus (England)
 Craig White (England)
 Nathan Astle (New Zealand)
 Graham Roope (England)

Gomersal

 Tony Blain (New Zealand)

Great Horton

 Imran Nazir (Pakistan)

Hanging Heaton

 Abdul Qadir (Pakistan)
 Dilip Vengsarkar (India)
 Sameer Dighe (India)

Hartshead Moor

 Shahid Mahboob (Pakistan)
 Jacob Martin (India)

Idle

 Jack Hobbs (England)
 Stewie Dempster (New Zealand)
 Dinusha Fernando (Sri Lanka)
 Ijaz Ahmed (Pakistan)
 Mohammad Hafeez (Pakistan)
 Doug Padgett (England)

Keighley

 Frank Woolley (England)
 Jack Hearne (England)
 Schofield Haigh (England)
 Eddie Paynter (England)
 Arthur Dolphin (England)

Lightcliffe
 Mohammed Kaif (India)

Manningham Mills

 Phil Sharpe (England)
 Mike Veletta (Australia)

Morley

 Bobby Peel (England)

Pudsey Congs

 Herbert Sutcliffe (England)
 Matthew Hoggard (England)
 Rana Naved-ul-Hasan (Pakistan)
 VVS Laxman (India)
 Paul Grayson (England)
 Chris Silverwood (England)
 Derek Randall (England)

Pudsey St Lawrence

 Leonard Hutton (England)
 Eddie Leadbeater (England)
 Steve Rhodes (England)
 Mark Greatbatch (New Zealand)
 Martin Crowe (New Zealand)
 Simon Doull (New Zealand)
 Chris Pringle (New Zealand)
 Anil Kumble (India)

Queensbury

 Haroon Rasheed (Pakistan)
 Rashid Khan (Pakistan)
 Rizwan-uz-Zaman (Pakistan)

Saltaire

 Sydney Barnes (England)
 Bill Voce (England)
 Tom Goddard (England)
 Jim Laker (England)
 Arthur Mitchell (England)

Spen Victoria

 George Pope (England)
 Edwin St Hill (West Indies)
 Iqbal Qasim (Pakistan)
 Mansoor Akhtar (Pakistan)
 Wasim Jaffer (India)
 Vinod Kambli (India)
 Rao Iftikhar Anjum (Pakistan)
Undercliffe

 Cec Parkin (England)
 Charles Llewellyn (South Africa)
 George Gunn (England)
 Vic Wilson (England)
 Les Jackson (England)
 Alan Ward (England)
 David Bairstow (England)
 Mohammad Imran Khan (Pakistan)
 Faheem Ashraf (Pakistan)
 Alexander George Wharf (England)
Windhill

 Lou Vincent (New Zealand)
 Charlie Parker (England)
 Les Ames (England)
 Amol Muzumdar (India)
 Learie Constantine (West Indies)

Woodlands

Yeadon

 Geoff Cope (England)
 Brian Close (England)
 Ted Peate (England)

In April 1999, Kathryn Leng became the first woman to play in the Bradford League, representing the former Yorkshire Bank club.

See also
 Bradford League, the football equivalent
 Priestley Cup

References

External links
 Official website
 play-cricket website

English domestic cricket competitions
Cricket competitions in Yorkshire
Cricket in West Yorkshire